The Dalarna Regiment, designation I 13, is a Swedish Army infantry unit that traced its origins back to the 16th century. The regiment's soldiers were originally recruited from the province of Dalarna, where it was later garrisoned. The unit was disbanded as a result of the disarmament policies set forward in the Defence Act of 2000. The regiment was re-raised as Dalarna Regiment (I 13) in 2021. The unit is based in Falun.

History 
The regiment has its origins in fänikor (companies) raised in Dalarna in 1542. During 1598, some of the units participated in the War against Sigismund and in 1605 one fänika from Dalarna fought at the Battle of Kircholm. In 1615, these units—along with fänikor from the nearby provinces of Uppland and Västmanland—were organised by Gustav II Adolf into Upplands storregemente, of which 1,400 of the total 3,000 soldiers were recruited in Dalarna. Upplands storregemente consisted of three field regiments, of which the Dalregementet was one. The Dalarna Regiment was also the first Swedish regiment to be allotted, which happened as early as in 1621. Parts of this grand regiment participated in the Polish–Swedish wars during the siege of Riga in 1621 and as garrison from 1626–1629. During this period, sometime between 1623 and 1628, the grand regiment was permanently split into three smaller regiments, of which the Dalarna Regiment was one. The regiment's first commander was Axel Oxenstierna.

The regiment was shipped to Germany and arrived at Wolgast in June 1631 to participate in the Thirty Years' War. Its first major battle was the Battle of Breitenfeld on 17 September that same year, where it stood in the first line. It also stood in the first line as part of the Swedish Brigade at the Battle of Lützen the next year, a battle which caused heavy casualties to the regiment. The regiment's "creator", Gustav II Adolf, was killed in a cavalry charge trying to ease the pressure on the Dalarna Regiment's part of the front. The regiment returned to Sweden to replenish shortly after and remained at home until 1638, when one of the regiment's two battalions was sent as garrison to Stettin. The Dalarna Regiment was one of the original 20 Swedish infantry regiments mentioned in the Swedish constitution of 1634. Carl Gustaf Wrangel was the commander from 1639 on. The second battalion was sent to Germany in 1642, and the whole regiment fought at the Battle of Leipzig that year, only to return to Sweden again the following year. They were present during the siege of Landskrona in 1644 during the short Torstenson War.

The Dalarna Regiment was shipped to Pomerania in 1655 following the outbreak of the Northern Wars. The regiment was part of the army that sieged and captured Marienburg in 1656, after which one of the battalions was sent to reinforce the garrison in Riga while the other participated in the attack on Copenhagen in 1659. In preparation for the Scanian War, one of the battalions was sent back to Germany in 1674, and was once again put under command of Carl Gustaf Wrangel, who led a thrust into Brandenburg, which ended in the Battle of Fehrbellin. The other battalion was used in Scania in the Battles of Halmstad, Lund and Landskrona in 1676–1677. A temporarily raised reserve regiment of eight companies was used against Norway in the Battle of Uddevalla.

When the Great Northern War started, the Dalarna Regiment was under the command of Magnus Stenbock and was used against Denmark but was soon sent to the Baltic region, taking part in the Battle of Narva in 1700 and the Crossing of Daugava in 1701. In 1702, the regiment received orders to join the main army at Warsaw. The regiment took part in the Battle of Kliszów, but was sent back to the Baltics for periods between 1702 and 1705. It then was subordinated to the main army that fought at Holovczyn, Malatitze and finally at the Battle of Poltava, where the regiment surrendered to the Russians. The regiment was reformed with new recruits in Sweden in 1710 and was sent to Pomerania and the Battle of Gadebusch in 1712. The Dalarna Regiment once again had to surrender, this time in 1713 after the Siege of Tönning. The regiment was reformed a second time, and took part in both the 1716 and 1718 attacks on Norway.

The next action of the regiment was in 1741 during the Hats' Russian War and the Battle of Villmanstrand, the last of the regiment's major battles. In 1758 the regiment was shipped to Pomerania yet again, this time to participate in the Seven Years' War, but the Dalarna Regiment saw no major battles during that war. In Gustav III's Russian War, the Dalarna Regiment was initially positioned along the southern Finnish coast but was later transferred to the inland, where several minor skirmishes took place during 1790. One of the battalions was involved in the First War against Napoleon, fighting minor battles against Norwegian troops which ended with the whole battalion being captured in early 1808. The final battle of the Dalarna Regiment was during the Campaign against Norway in 1814, in the Battle of Kjölbergs bro, one of the last battles Sweden fought before adopting a policy of neutrality.

The regiment was given the designation I 13 (13th Infantry Regiment) in a general order in 1816. Dalregementet was garrisoned in Falun from 1908. In 1973, the regiment gained the new designation I 13/Fo 53 as a consequence of a merge with the local defence district Fo 53. The regiment was disbanded in 2000.

The regiment was re-established on 23 October 2021, a symbolically chosen day for historical reasons. On 23 October 1642, the First Battle of Leipzig was fought, where the original Dalarna Regiment formed a brigade together with a German regiment. Dalarna Regiment was inaugurated by His Majesty the King Carl XVI Gustaf to the tunes of the Royal Swedish Army Band. The Supreme Commander of the Swedish Armed Forces, General Micael Bydén, Chief of Army, Major General Karl Engelbrektson and the Minister of Defence Peter Hultqvist also attended the inauguration.

Campaigns 
The War against Sigismund (1598–1599)
The Polish War (1600–1629)
The Thirty Years' War (1630–1648)
The Torstenson War (1643–1645)
The Northern Wars (1655–1661)
The Scanian War (1674–1679)
The Great Northern War (1700–1721)
The Hats' Russian War (1741–1743)
The Seven Years' War (1757–1762)
The Gustav III's Russian War (1788–1790)
The First War against Napoleon (1805–1810)
The Campaign against Norway (1814)

Organisation 

1634(?)
Livkompaniet
Överstelöjtnantens kompani
Majorens kompani
Orsa kompani
Rättviks kompani
Gagnef kompani
Mora kompani
Västerdals kompani

1814(?)
Livkompaniet
Leksands kompani
Gagnef kompani
Gustafs kompani
Västerdals kompani
Orsa kompani
Mora kompani
Rättviks kompani

Heraldry and traditions

Coat of arms
The coat of the arms of the Dalarna Regiment (I 13/Fo 53) 1977–1994 and the Dalarna Brigade (Dalabrigaden, NB 13) 1994–2000. Blazon: "Azure, the provincial badge of Dalarna, an open crown or between two bolts of the last with points argent in saltire. The shield surmounted two muskets in saltire or". The coat of arms of the Dalarna Regiment (I 13/Fo 53) 1994–2000 and the Dalarna Group (Dalregementsgruppen) since 2000. Blazon: "Azure, the provincial badge of Dalarna, an open crown or between two bolts of the last with points argent in saltire. The shield surmounted two swords in saltire or."

Colours, standards and guidons
The 1953 colour was presented to the regiment by His Majesty King Gustaf VI Adolf on 15 September at Dalavallen in Falun. The last regimental colour was presented to the regiment at Dalavallen in Falun by His Majesty King Carl XVI Gustaf on 28 August 1997. It was used as regimental colour by I 13/Fo 53 until 1 July 2000. The colour is drawn by Kristina Holmgård-Åkerberg and manufactured with appliqué technique by the Engelbrektssons Flag factory. Blazon: "On blue cloth the provincial badge of Dalarna; two yellow bolts in saltire with white heads and between them an open yellow crown. On a yellow border at the upper side of the colour, battle honours (Lützen 1632, Leipzig 1642, Lund 1676, Landskrona 1677, Narva 1700, Düna 1701, Kliszow 1702, Holovczyn 1708, Malatitze 1708, Gadebusch 1712) in blue."

Medals
In 1996, the Dalregementets (I 13) förtjänstmedalj ("Dalarna Regiment (I 13) Medal for Merit") in gold, silver and bronze (DalregGM/SM/BM) of the 8th size was established. The medal ribbon is blue with two narrow yellow stripes on the middle.

In 2000, the Dalregementets (I 13) och Dalabrigadens (NB 13) minnesmedalj ("Dalarna Regiment (I 13) and Dalarna Brigade (NB 13) Commemorative Medal") in silver (DalregbrigSMM) of the 8th size was established. The medal ribbon is of blue moiré with a yellow stripe on the middle followed on both sides first by a red stripe and then by a yellow stripe.

Heritage
The old officers mess is today in its original place in the chancellery building and is run by the regiment's companion association. The Dalarna Regiment Group is the heir to the heritage and traditions of the regiment and organizationally under the Life Guards (LG). The Dalarna Regiment Group took over the colour and traditions in connection with disbandment of the regiment and the brigade on 30 June 2000. From 1 July 2013, the traditions of the regiment will be continued by the Dalarna Battalion, included in the Dalarna Regiment Group (Dalregementsgruppen).

Commanding officers
Regimental commanders active at the regiment the years 1621–2000.

Commanders

1621–1632: Åke Oxenstierna
1632–1639: Johan Yxkull
1639–1644: Carl Gustaf Wrangel
1644–1650: Gustaf Adolf Lewenhaupt
1650–1651: Jakob Kasimir De la Gardie
1651–1659: Johan Bourdon
1659–1673: Jakob von Wulfven 
1673–1683: Hans Abraham Kruuse af Verchou
1683–1689: Carl Svinhufvud 
1689–1696: Gustaf Heydenfelt 
1696–1698: Bernhard von Liewen
1698–1700: Gustaf Anrep
1700–1706: Magnus Stenbock
1706–1709: Gustaf Henrik von Siegroth 
1710–1719: Magnus Julius De la Gardie 
1719–1735: Carl Fredrik Tegensköld
1735–1740: Johan Fredrik Didron
1740–1750: Axel Johan Gripenhielm
1750–1768: Gustaf Henrik Mannerheim 
1768–1777: Carl Hierta
1777–1781: Johan Beck-Friis
1781–1785: Gustaf Duwall
1785–1794: Wilhelm Mauritz Klingspor
1794–1801: Georg Henrik von Wright
1801–1804: Gustaf Gyllengranat
1804–1813: Thure Gustaf Cederström
1813–1820: Carl Pontus Gahn 
1820–1835: Carl Albrecht Leijonflyckt
1835–1852: Henrik Wilhelm Örn 
1852–1868: Johan Fredrik Söderhielm 
1868–1874: Lars Gustaf Tegnér
1874–1885: Herman David Krautmeyer
1885–1894: Gustaf Toll
1894–1898: Charles von Oelreich
1894–1898: Carl Vilhelm Knut von Rosen (acting)
1898–1903: Carl Gustaf Hult
1903–1910: Johan Gustaf Fabian Wrangel
1910–1916: Fredrik Björkman
1916–1926: Axel A:son Sjögreen
1926–1933: Rikard Salwén
1933–1940: Anders Andén
1940–1944: Colonel Ivar Backlund
1944–1951: Olof Häger
1951–1958: Erik Drakenberg
1958–1962: Bengt Carl Olof Hjelm
1962–1971: Bror von Vegesack
1971–1979: Hans Lodin
1979–1982: Senior colonel Clarence Jonsson
1982–1989: Fredrik Gyllenram
1989–1996: Lars Erik Verner Wallén
1996–2000: Rolf Dahlström
2000–2021: –
2021–20xx: Ronny Modigs

Deputy commanders
1978–1982: Fredrik Gyllenram

Names, designations and locations

See also
List of Swedish infantry regiments

Footnotes

References

Notes

Print

Further reading

Infantry regiments of the Swedish Army
Military units and formations established in 1625
Military units and formations disestablished in 1709
Military units and formations established in 1710
Military units and formations disestablished in 1713
Military units and formations established in 1713
Military units and formations disestablished in 2000
Military units and formations established in 2021